André Grobéty (22 June 1933 – 20 July 2013) was a Swiss footballer who played as a right-back.

Career
During his career, Grobéty played at the club level for Servette FC, Lausanne Sports, and FC Meyrin.

In the Swiss Cup final on 15 May 1967, in the former Wankdorf Stadium, Grobéty played for Lausanne, the opponents were Basel. Helmut Hauser scored the decisive goal via penalty. The game went down in football history due to the sit-down strike that followed this goal. After 88 minutes of play, with the score at 1–1, referee Karl Göppel awarded Basel a controversial penalty. (Grobéty had pushed Hauser gently in the back and he let himself drop theatrically.) Subsequent to the 2–1 lead for Basel the Lausanne players refused to resume the game and they sat down demonstratively on the pitch. The referee had to abandon the match. Basel were awarded the cup with a 3–0 forfait.

Grobéty also earned 41 caps and scored one goal for the Switzerland national team, and participated in the 1962 FIFA World Cup and the 1966 FIFA World Cup.

References

External links
 

1933 births
2013 deaths
Footballers from Geneva
Swiss men's footballers
Association football fullbacks
Switzerland international footballers
1962 FIFA World Cup players
1966 FIFA World Cup players
Servette FC players
FC Lausanne-Sport players
FC Meyrin players